The Horse Is Dead is a live album by English punk rock band Anti-Nowhere League, released in 1996.

The album was later re-released as disc one of the two disc double album So What?: Early Demos and Live Abuse, as well as the 1999 complete re-release Live: So What?

Track listing
"So What"
"Pig Iron"
"For You"
"Crime"
"Working for the Company"
"Animal"
"Nowhere Man"
"I Hate People"
"Let's Break the Law"
"Noddy"
"Snowman"
"Ballad of J.J. Decay"
"Wreck-a-Nowhere"
"Runaway"
"We're the League"

References

Anti-Nowhere League albums
1996 live albums